Ivanovka is a rural locality (a selo) and the administrative center of Ivanovskoye Rural Settlement, Oktyabrsky District, Volgograd Oblast, Russia. The population was 511 as of 2010. There are 16 streets.

Geography 
The village is located in steppe on Yergeni, on the Myshkova River, 190 km from Volgograd, 37 km from Oktyabrsky.

References 

Rural localities in Oktyabrsky District, Volgograd Oblast